National Tertiary Route 907, or just Route 907 (or ) is a National Road Route of Costa Rica, located in the Guanacaste province.

Description
In Guanacaste province the route covers Nicoya canton (San Antonio, Quebrada Honda districts).

References

Highways in Costa Rica